William H. Turner Technical Arts High School, commonly referred to as Turner Tech, is a secondary technical school located at 10151 NW 19th Avenue in West Little River, unincorporated Miami-Dade County, Florida. Turner Tech is located behind Miami Central High School. According to US news (Best High Schools), William H. Turner Technical Arts High School is ranked #2574 in the National Rankings and earned a silver medal. As of July 21, 2017, Turner Tech's principal is Uwezo Frasier. The school is ranked as a "B" school and is part of the Miami Dade Public Schools magnet program.

History 
Turner Tech was founded in 1993 and was named after William H. Turner, former chairperson of the Miami-Dade County School Board and a former member of the Florida State Legislature. Turner, along with Roger C. Cuevas (a former Miami-Dade County Public Schools Superintendent), had a dream to construct a school that would provide academic and technical skills to prepare youth for the 21st century.

Turner Tech operates as a small high school, with approximately 1,800 students.

Academies 
Turner Tech is a technical school that teaches students skills for their chosen program. Turner Tech is one of the first high schools to separate each job criteria in different branches.

Students work in groups within each academy. The academies are:

 Academy of Criminal Justice (CJ)
 Academy of Entertainment Technology (AET)
 Academy of Business Finance (ABF)
 Academy of Information Technology (AOIT)
 Academy of Medical Science (AMS)
 Academy of Veterinary Science & Agricultural Technology (VSAT)
 Academy of Instructional Research (AIR)

The academic course is integrated into the career major the student has chosen. Students chose a career academy during their freshman year. By successfully completing a sequence of technical courses, they gain certification(s) in one or more related careers.

All students assemble an active career portfolio, which includes examples of their individual work. Under each academy, students participate in hands-on experiences in actual workplaces and school-based interests.

For each academy there is a different shirt and different color. The corresponding colors are:

 Academy of Entertainment Technology: Black
 Academy of Medical Sciences: Navy Blue
 Academy of Veterinary Science and Agricultural Technology: Forest Green
 Academy of Information Technology and Entrepreneurship: Royal Blue
 Academy of Criminal Justice: Gray
 Academy of Business and Finance: Burgundy

Demographics
The student body makeup is 33% male and 67% female, and the total minority enrollment is 99%. Turner Technical Arts High School is 86% Black, 9% Hispanic, 2% White, and 3% other.

AET 
The Academy of Entertainment Technology focuses on television broadcasting and production, and, most importantly, creativity. AET gets footage for films, edits films, makes news broadcasts, and creates a variety of independent movies to submit to competitions. AET is divided into two different sub-categories: Film and Television Production.

AET's Skills USA is where students compete with what they've learned. The students compete with other schools on speed editing, broadcasting, and script making.

AET used to include Diesel Technology, Turner Tech's only automotive program. Although Diesel Technology was the only AET program to win VICA competitions at the time it was cut from the school in the middle of the school year of 2003–2004. This prompted all the "Diesel Boys" to join other programs, which shared little to no relation. Most either stayed in AET or transferred to Agriscience.

AMS

The Academy of Medical Sciences at Turner Tech provides an excellent education for high school students who want to make a difference in the ever-advancing and demanding field of health care. The academy's programs provides several diverse career paths which prepares students for employment or advanced training in the health industry for a wide variety of medical professions with job-related training and a solid academic curriculum including National Industry certification.

Students receive hands-on training in Turner Tech's well-equipped training labs and classrooms with pediatrics and human patient simulators. They serve as interns at healthcare sites, such as hospitals, laboratories, medical offices, pharmacies, and medical libraries. Students attending the Medical Academy can earn much more than grades and a high school diploma; they can also receive college credit and industry-recognized certification in more than one field. The Medical Academy offers students the opportunity to join national professional organizations, such as HOSA-Future Health Professionals.

Turner Tech HOSA, the Career Technical Student Organization HOSA-Future Health Professionals chapter at Turner Tech, boasts one of the largest membership counts in the national organization. The organization gives its members the opportunities to compete in a myriad of competitions that span the breadth of the health occupations field, and provides its members the opportunity to lead the organization at regional, state, and national levels.

The Academy of Medical Sciences provides its students with seven programs including the new Advanced Medical Sciences Program, which simulates the rigors and academic intensity of medical school and a top-level medical career. The program is highly selective and candidates must go through an application and interview process, in an effort to secure one of 25 seats.

The Academy includes 4 programs student are able to be certified in.

VSAT
The Agriscience Academy, or Ag for short, encourages students to play a role in society that deals with agriculture such as livestock and horticulture. In the Animal Science and Services program, students handle livestock such as cattle, in order to better understand the meat industry as well as the veterinary field of large animals. Animals include pigs, sheep, steers and breeding cattle. Students also attend local fairs like the Miami-Dade County Fair and the State Fair in Tampa. In order for this to be possible, the students have to join FFA or Future Farmers of America. FFA allows students to learn leadership skills and parliament procedures. Tractor driving and Speech are also part of the FFA.

Students spend about 3 to 10 months (including weekends, holidays, and no-school days) taking care of several SAE projects. The students exercise, bathe, and feed the animals. They also clean the animals' pens. After that, the students take the animals to local fairs. There, the students exhibit the animals to their potential using various equipment. Some competitions have included Showmanship, Fitting and Grooming, and Market. The FFA students compete with each other and other FFA or 4H students of other agricultural schools in Florida, depending on the location of the fair. As soon as the fairs are over, the students must leave their animals because they raised the animals for meat; the animals are then sent to slaughter. Here are more information about the animals the students nurture:

 Pigs: usually one of the first animals, along with lambs, that the students raise in their first year. Swine are very intelligent and very excited animals. They can range from 180 pounds to 250 pounds. The male pigs come castrated when the students purchase their hogs. The breed normally used are Yorkshire crosses and Hampshire crosses.
 Lambs: usually one of the first animals that students raise as their first SAE project. Lambs are the most vulnerable projects in the Ag. Academy. They are easily killed by dogs. Students learn to castrate male lambs, and learn to shear the sheep, taking the wool off the animal with a pair of clippers.
 Steers: a castrated bull calf that ranges from 8 months to 2 years old. These animals are usually given to the juniors and seniors of the program. Students can have up to two of these animals. Steers range from 850 pounds to 1250 pounds or higher. Students learn to "halterbreak" or having the animal accustom to a halter and the students themselves. Steers range in different personalities. Some like to ram and kick any student that comes near; others are either gentle or timid but easy to work with. The steers are the most costly animals. They usually cost between $500 to $1,000. Students receive their steers from Florida ranches.

The academy also offers a veterinary assisting course, in which students raise poultry, goats, rabbits, and guinea pigs. Unlike the animal science animals, these animals are not sold for market, so the students that buy animals can keep them if they choose after the fair. The students compete every year at the Miami-Dade Fair in showmanship, breed i.d., fitting and grooming, and shows (where the animal may place, or get special awards like best of breed and best in show).

CJ 
The Academy of Public Service is divided into two different divisions, Criminal Justice and Teachers Assistants. Both academic programs are joined in yearly competitions against other Florida high schools within the Florida Public Service Association (FPSA).  Currently Eric G. Clayton oversees the Criminal Justice Program for the high school students and helps advance their fields in the Criminal Justice program. The Criminal Justice Program offers many opportunities for high school seniors, from internships with the Miami-Dade Correctional Facility to becoming a City of Miami or a City of North Miami Beach police explorer. Many CJ students are enrolled at Miami-Dade College North as dual enrollment students wherein they receive their Associate of Arts in General Studies before they graduate high school. The Public Service Academy is one of the best academies for students ready to take on the Criminal Justice or Teacher Assistant fields. Beginning the fall of school year 2022, the CJ Academy will be offering certification within the state of Florida as a 911 Telecommunicator.

AOIT 
The Academy of Information Technology (AOIT) is for students who wish to enter the job field with knowledge of current technology. Students learn basic skills necessary to qualify for entry-level positions in the job market. Eventually, they move to advanced programs such as the Adobe and Microsoft Suite. At the end of their freshman year, the students may choose to pursue a program of study in digital design, entrepreneurship, or web design.

Once students become proficient, the academy provides them with opportunities to apply their skills and enables them to interact with business leaders within the community through job shadows, mentorships, internships, and on-the-job training.

The AOIT Academy is certified by the National Career Academy Coalition and is also certified under the Career and Profession Education Act, offering students industry certification in Adobe Photoshop, Dreamweaver, Flash, and Microsoft Office Specialist.

Entrepreneurship: This field teaches students how to run their own business and apply acquired business skills to real-life scenarios. Each year, the Entrepreneurship Business Expo tests students' ability to use their skills to create ideas and sell them in a simulated environment. Students plan and design their own business plans, then put their knowledge to use in marketing and selling their product or services as they garner a hands-on experience useful for preparing them for the real world challenges and risks of entrepreneurship.

Digital Design: In this field students are taught how to create layouts, design their own banners, posters, covers, edit images with advanced tools, and acquire an artistic appreciation through technology. Students are introduced to graphic art and image editing through the use of specific software such as Adobe InDesign, Photoshop, and Illustrator. The course is dually productive; it teaches students to be proficient in editing through computers and to develop a perspective in art.

Web Design: In this program of study, students learn to create web pages/sites that are interesting, informative, and visually appealing. They also develop the skills necessary to deal with a dynamic and fast-changing workplace. Web Design students learn to become knowledgeable with the Internet and Web software such as Adobe Dreamweaver and Flash. Students then have the opportunity to apply these skills as they design web pages for actual businesses within the community.

ACAD
The Academy of Civil Engineering and Architectural Design. An upcoming academy that's open for enrollment for incoming freshmen students.

Success 
Turner Tech was recognized as one of America's top 10 New American High Schools in an awards course sponsored by Business Week and McGraw-Hill Educational and Professional Publishing Group in cooperation with the National Center for Research in Vocational Education and the Office of Vocations and Adult Education, U.S. Department of Education. The United States Department of Education with the Big Picture Company, funded by the School to Work Opportunities Act of 1994, identified Turner Tech as one of five urban high schools on the cutting edge of education reform.

The American Federation of Teachers highlighted Turner Tech as one of five national models of school restructuring which focus on helping students reach high academic standards and prepare for good jobs. In 1999–2000, Turner Tech became one of the only 10 New Millennium High Schools in the state of Florida.

In 2006, Steve Pierre helped Turner Tech be selected as one of the winners of the Got Milk? Healthiest Student Bodies Contest. Got Milk received nearly 1,500 contest entries from schools across the country and a panel of judges selected Turner Tech as one of the top 50 Healthiest Student Bodies in the nation. Turner Tech received a $1,000 grant to fund health, wellness, PE and fitness and nutrition programs.

References

 https://www.usnews.com/education/best-high-schools/florida/districts/miami-dade-county-public-schools/william-h-turner-technical-arts-high-school-4862

External links 
William H. Turner Technical Arts High School

High schools in Miami-Dade County, Florida
Public high schools in Florida
Miami-Dade County Public Schools
Magnet schools in Florida